Semisi Taulava (born 26 February 1983) is a Tongan rugby union player for Worcester Warriors in the Aviva Premiership.

He plays as a number eight or lock.

Taulava has previously played at Wanganui, Taranaki, Worthing and at Birmingham & Solihull before his year at Titans.

External links
Worcester Warriors profile
Rotherham Titans profile
Stat Bunker profile

Living people
Birmingham & Solihull R.F.C. players
Rotherham Titans players
Worcester Warriors players
1983 births
Tongan rugby union players
Tongan expatriate rugby union players
Expatriate rugby union players in New Zealand
Expatriate rugby union players in England
Tongan expatriate sportspeople in New Zealand
Tongan expatriate sportspeople in England
Rugby union number eights
Rugby union locks